5urprise (pronounced surprise), was the first ever South Korean actor group and consists of five actors: Yoo Il, Seo Kang-joon, Gong Myung, Kang Tae-oh and Lee Tae-hwan.

History
5urprise was launched by talent agency Fantagio in September 2013. The group members were selected through Fantagio's "Actor′s League," a program for discovering aspiring actors, and were trained for two years before making their entertainment debut.

Unlike idol groups which begin their careers as singers and later expand their endeavors to acting, 5urprise did the opposite. As their first project, they made their acting debut in After School: Lucky or Not, a 12-episode mobile drama with each episode lasting 15 minutes, and viewed through Nate Hoppin, BTV, and T-Store on smartphones and tablet computers. They played five members of a high school club who encounter an outcast (played by actress Kim So-eun) and as they complete "missions," they build a friendship with each other and coax the shy girl out of her shell. 5urprise released the single "Hey U Come On" for the mobile drama's soundtrack. Pre-debut, members of the group also appeared in music videos of female pop group Hello Venus. 5urprise released their first single in 2014, titled From My Heart.

On March 31, 2020, it was announced by Fantagio that all five members have decided to part ways with the company, leaving the group disbanded.

Filmography
2013: After School: Lucky or Not
2015: Taste of Others (Episode 4, 5, & 7)
2018: Netflix's Busted! (Season 1; Episode 4)

Discography

Soundtrack
 2013: "Hey U Come On"

Single albums

References

External links 

  on Fantagio 

K-pop music groups
Musical groups established in 2013
2013 establishments in South Korea
South Korean boy bands